Desperate Teenage Lovedolls is a 1984 low budget underground film, shot on super-8 film by David Markey, about a rock band of teenage runaways. The film was released on DVD in 2003. A sequel, Lovedolls Superstar, was released in 1986.

Plot
Two girls rediscover their love for playing rock, find a drummer and begin practicing. When one of their mothers intervenes, they run away from home and are forced to fend for themselves on the streets against gangs and rival bands. Soon they are discovered and taken under the wing of rock manager Johnny Tremaine (played by Steven McDonald) who uses them for sex and his own aspirations of wealth. The Love Dolls set out to get revenge on those who have wronged them, and rise to the top of the rock world.

DVD release
In 2003, the film was released in extended DVD format as Desperate Teenage Lovedolls (20th anniversary edition).

See also
 Desperate Teenage Lovedolls (soundtrack)
 Lovedolls Superstar (film)
 Lovedolls Superstar (soundtrack)

References

 Review and synopsis at Monsters at Play
 Official site at We Got Power Films

External links

Film details at HK Flix

1984 films
1980s musical comedy films
1984 comedy films
Punk films
1980s English-language films